Ryan Navarro (born July 5, 1994) is an American football long snapper for the Philadelphia Stars of the United States Football League (USFL). He also played for the Memphis Express of the Alliance of American Football (AAF) and Los Angeles Wildcats of the XFL. He played college football at Riverside City College before transferring to Oregon State.

Early years and college
Ryan Navarro was born on July 5, 1994 in Riverside, California. Growing up in  Murrieta, California, he helped Vista Murrieta High School to win the CIF championship in 2011. He originally played college football at Riverside City College. He played long snapper for Riverside City in 2013 and 2014. Navarro arrived at Oregon State as a junior in 2015. He would play all games in the 2015 and 2016 seasons.

Professional career

Oakland Raiders
In 2017, Navarro signed with the Oakland Raiders after going undrafted in the 2017 NFL Draft. He wouldn’t make the final roster.

Washington Redskins
In 2018, Navarro was signed by the Washington Redskins for mini camps. Once again, he did not make the final roster.

Memphis Express
In 2018, Navarro signed with the Memphis Express of the Alliance of American Football for the 2019 AAF season. The league ceased operations in April 2019.

Los Angeles Wildcats
In October 2019, Navarro was selected by the Los Angeles Wildcats in the 2020 XFL Draft's open phase. He had his contract terminated when the league suspended operations on April 10, 2020.

Philadelphia Stars
Navarro was selected in the 35th round of the 2022 USFL Draft by the Philadelphia Stars.

References

1994 births
Living people
American football long snappers
Los Angeles Wildcats (XFL) players
Memphis Express (American football) players
Oregon State Beavers football players
People from Murrieta, California
Players of American football from Riverside, California
Riverside City Tigers football players
Philadelphia Stars (2022) players